Olivier Allamand (born 31 July 1969) is a French freestyle skier and Olympic medalist. He won the silver medal at the 1992 Winter Olympics in Albertville. He also competed at the 1994 Winter Olympics.

References

External links

1969 births
Living people
Sportspeople from La Tronche
French male freestyle skiers
Freestyle skiers at the 1992 Winter Olympics
Freestyle skiers at the 1994 Winter Olympics
Olympic silver medalists for France
Olympic medalists in freestyle skiing
Medalists at the 1992 Winter Olympics
Olympic freestyle skiers of France
Université Savoie-Mont Blanc alumni
Sportspeople from Isère